Clare Anne Adamson FBCS (née Pickering; born 1 August 1967) is a Scottish politician who has been the Member of the Scottish Parliament (MSP) for the Motherwell and Wishaw since 2016. A member of the Scottish National Party (SNP), she was previously an additional MSP for the Central Scotland region from 2011 to 2016.

A graduate of the Glasgow Caledonian University, before entering politics Adamson was a computer scientist. In 2007, she was elected to the North Lanarkshire Council for the Wishaw ward. She ran unsuccessfully as a candidate for the Motherwell and Wishaw constituency, but was elected as an additional member for the Central Scotland region in 2011. Adamson was elected as the MSP for Motherwell and Wishaw in 2016 and was re-elected for a third term in the 2021 election. She has since served as the Convener of the Scottish Parliament's Constitution, Europe, External Affairs and Culture Committee.

Early life and career
Clare Anne Pickering was born on 1 August 1967 in Motherwell, North Lanarkshire, to Eileen and George Pickering. She moved to grow up in Wishaw at the age of seven and she studied Computer Information Systems at Glasgow Caledonian University, graduating with the degree of BSc (with distinction).

In 1984 Adamson joined the Scottish National Party and she worked at the SNP HQ Campaign Unit as Project Manager of the Party's Activate Project from 2003 to 2007. She was previously a European Development Manager (IT) at a Glasgow-based software house. She belongs to the National Union of Journalists and is a Fellow of the British Computer Society.

Adamson ran as a candidate for the SNP in various elections, but was unsuccessful. She ran for election to the North Lanarkshire Council in 2003 and contested Lanark & Hamilton East in the 2010 UK General Election. In the 2007 Scottish local elections, she was elected to the North Lanarkshire Council, representing her home town of the Wishaw ward. She stood down from the council in the 2012 election following her election to the Scottish Parliament.

Member of the Scottish Parliament 

In the 2011 Scottish Parliament election, Adamson was the SNP's candidate for the Motherwell and Wishaw constituency. She was defeated by Scottish Labour's John Pentland and was elected as an additional member of the Scottish Parliament for the Central Scotland region. After being elected to the parliament, she served as the Parliamentary Liaison Officer to Culture Secretary Fiona Hyslop.

Adamson has continued to be actively involved with the Scottish Accident Prevention Council, as Vice Chairperson, and the Lanarkshire International Children's Games Organising Committee.

Adamson ran again as candidate for the constituency of Motherwell and Wishaw. She successfully defeated John Pentland and was elected to represent the constituency in the Scottish Parliament. She was returned at the 2021 Scottish Parliament election. She has served as Convener of the Constitution, Europe, External Affairs and Culture Committee since 2021.

Personal life 
Adamson married John Adamson, a headteacher, in 2002. They both have one son, with her husband also having his own three children. She has a dog called Coco and enjoys reading and listening to music.

References

External links 
 
 Clare Adamson's Party Website
 Lanarkshire International Children's Games 2011 
 Scottish Accident Prevention Council
 STV 2010 General Election profile
 Wishaw Press councillors' expenses review 2008–2009
 Wishaw Press councillors' expenses review 2009–2010
 STV Local

1967 births
Living people
People from Motherwell
Councillors in North Lanarkshire
Alumni of Glasgow Caledonian University
Scottish National Party councillors
Scottish National Party MSPs
Members of the Scottish Parliament 2011–2016
Members of the Scottish Parliament 2016–2021
Members of the Scottish Parliament 2021–2026
Female members of the Scottish Parliament
Fellows of the British Computer Society
Politicians from North Lanarkshire
Women councillors in Scotland